George Chakhava (1923–2007) was a Georgian architect, best known for the Bank of Georgia headquarters in Tbilisi, which he co-designed with Zurab Jalaghania.

George Chakhava was born in Tbilisi in 1923, and earned bachelor's degree in architecture from the Georgian Technical University in 1949.

The Bank of Georgia headquarters in Tbilisi was originally built for the Ministry of Highway Construction of the Georgian SSR and finished in 1975, at a time when Chakhava was Georgia's Deputy Minister of Highway Construction. It became the headquarters of the Bank of Georgia in 2007.

Chakhava co-designed Cafe Fantasy in Batumi, with Zurab Kapanadze, which opened in 1975, but has been closed since 2000.

In 1983, Chakhava received the USSR State Prize.

References

1923 births
2007 deaths
20th-century architects from Georgia (country)
Architects from Tbilisi
Date of birth missing